Joseph Hogan (born 24 February 1938) is a Scottish former footballer whose only club at the professional level was Partick Thistle.

Career
Raised in West Lothian, Hogan originally played as a forward; he joined Partick Thistle  as a teenager in 1955, having enjoyed a single, successful season in the Junior level with Newtongrange Star, where he won the Edinburgh & District League alongside future Scotland star Alex Young.

He was at the Jags during a relatively successful era for the club across the 1950s and early 60s, and played in two of their Scottish League Cup final appearances in the period (all of which were lost) – against Celtic in 1956 and against Heart of Midlothian in the 1958 edition, by which point he had changed position and become established at right back. Hogan did win the Glasgow Cup in the 1960–61 season, and was involved in the club's challenge for the Scottish Football League title in the 1962–63 season, though they lost form after delays caused by a very harsh winter.

He was selected once for the Scotland U23 team in 1961, and played in two trial matches between the Scottish Football League XI and a SFA XI, but was never capped for either team at full level.

Personal life
Outside football Hogan trained to become a schoolteacher, specialising in Physics, and was later an education officer for Strathclyde Regional Council. He was also an accomplished golfer.

References

Living people
1938 births
People educated at Bathgate Academy
People from Armadale, West Lothian
Footballers from West Lothian
Scottish footballers
Partick Thistle F.C. players
Scottish Football League representative players
Newtongrange Star F.C. players
Scottish schoolteachers
Scottish Junior Football Association players
Scottish Football League players
Association football forwards
Association football fullbacks
Scotland under-23 international footballers